"Without You" is a single by Brooke Fraser released in 2005. The song debuted and peaked on the New Zealand Singles chart at number sixteen on 24 January 2005 and spent just nine weeks on the chart.

Track listing
"Without You" (Album version)
"Honest"
"Woodstock"

Charts

References

2005 singles
Brooke Fraser songs
2004 songs
Sony BMG singles
Songs written by Brooke Fraser